John Other Day, also known as Anpetutokeca, was a Dakota mediator from Minnesota who sought peace between Native people and white settlers.

During the Dakota War of 1862, Other Day guided 62 European-Americans 150 miles through Native American territory to safety and later served as a scout for the forces commanded by General Henry H. Sibley. The United States Congress recognized him for his services.

References

 Brown, Curt (May 20, 2017). "Unusual couple went from heroism to poverty." Star Tribune. 
 Pederson, Kern (1949). Makers of Minnesota. St. Paul: Minnesota Territorial Centennial.

Dakota people
People from Minnesota
Dakota War of 1862